Stijn Vandenbergh (born 25 April 1984) is a Belgian former professional road racing cyclist, who rode professionally between 2007 and 2020 for the , ,  and  teams.

Born in Oudenaarde, Vandenbergh, as a first year professional, won the first stage and held the yellow jersey to the win of the Tour of Ireland.

Major results

2004
 1st Omloop Het Volk U23
 10th Internationale Wielertrofee Jong Maar Moedig
 10th Ronde van Vlaanderen U23
2006
 3rd Internationale Wielertrofee Jong Maar Moedig
2007
 1st  Overall Tour of Ireland
1st Young rider classification
1st Stage 1
 9th Grand Prix of Aargau Canton
 10th Kampioenschap van Vlaanderen
2008
 9th Grand Prix de Denain
2009
 2nd Grote Prijs Jef Scherens
2010
 9th Dwars door Vlaanderen
2013
 2nd Omloop Het Nieuwsblad
 8th Gent–Wevelgem
 10th Dwars door Vlaanderen
2014
 4th E3 Harelbeke
 4th Tour of Flanders
 5th Kuurne–Brussels–Kuurne
 8th Overall Tour of Qatar
2015
 4th Gent–Wevelgem
 4th Omloop Het Nieuwsblad
 7th Le Samyn
2016
 1st Stage 5 Volta a la Comunitat Valenciana
 1st Stage 1 (TTT) Tour de San Luis
 3rd Overall Tour of Belgium
2018
 10th Tro-Bro Léon
2019
 5th Overall Boucles de la Mayenne
 6th Le Samyn

References

External links

1984 births
Living people
Belgian male cyclists
People from Oudenaarde
Cyclists at the 2012 Summer Olympics
Olympic cyclists of Belgium
Cyclists from East Flanders
European Games competitors for Belgium
Cyclists at the 2015 European Games